Robert Adams' Book of Alternate Worlds is an anthology of alternate history short works edited by Robert Adams, Martin H. Greenberg and Pamela Crippen Adams. It was first published in paperback by Signet Books in July 1987.

The book collects nine short stories by various authors, together with an introductory essay by Robert Adams.

Contents
"Introduction" (Robert Adams)
"The Other World" (Murray Leinster)
"Target: Berlin!" (George Alec Effinger)
"Adept's Gambit" (Fritz Leiber)
"Last Enemy" (H. Beam Piper)
"Aristotle and the Gun" (L. Sprague de Camp)
"There's a Wolf in My Time Machine" (Larry Niven)
"Many Mansions" (Robert Silverberg)
"Remember the Alamo!" (T. R. Fehrenbach)
"One Way Street" (Jerome Bixby)

Notes

1987 anthologies
Science fiction anthologies
Martin H. Greenberg anthologies
Short stories about parallel universes
Signet Books books